Lynn Vincent (born 1962) is an American writer, journalist, and author or co-author of 12 books. Vincent's work focuses on memoirs, history, and narrative nonfiction. In 2022 she was appointed as the executive editor of WORLD magazine. 

Her 2018 book, INDIANAPOLIS: The True Story of the Worst Sea Disaster in U.S. Navy History and the Fifty-Year Fight to Exonerate an Innocent Man, debuted at #5 on the New York Times bestseller list. INDIANAPOLIS was chosen by Amazon editors as the Best History Book of 2018 and the #3 best book of the year overall. The book was also selected as one of the Best of 2018 by Barnes and Noble, Kirkus Reviews, Military Times, and NPR.

In 2010, Vincent wrote, with Todd Burpo, Heaven Is for Real: A Little Boy's Astounding Story of His Trip to Heaven and Back, the story of the four-year-old son of a Nebraska pastor who during emergency surgery visits heaven. Heaven spent more than 200 consecutive weeks on the NYT bestseller list, with 77 weeks at #1. In 2014, the book became a Sony major motion picture directed by Randall Wallace (Braveheart, Secretariat), and grossed $91 million in the U.S..

Vincent co-wrote Sarah Palin's 2009 memoir, Going Rogue: An American Life.

In 2006, Vincent collaborated with Ron Hall and Denver Moore on Same Kind of Different as Me, the story of a homeless black man and a wealthy white art dealer who rescue each other during difficult circumstances. Same Kind spent three years on the NYT list with more than 1 million copies sold, reaching #1 in October 2017 when Paramount released the major motion picture. Directed by Michael Carney, the film stars Greg Kinnear, Oscar winner Renee Zellweger, Djimon Hounsou (Blood Diamond, Gladiator) and Oscar winner Jon Voight.
 
Vincent, a U.S. Navy veteran, spent 11 years as an investigative reporter and feature writer for WORLD magazine, a Christian newsweekly. She has lectured on writing at the World Journalism Institute, and at The King's College in New York City.

Background
Vincent was born in Springfield, Massachusetts and lives in San Diego, California.

References

External links
 Lynn Vincent Official website
 Articles by Lynn Vincent in WORLD magazine

1962 births
Living people
American magazine editors
American political writers
Military personnel from California
California Republicans
Ghostwriters
Writers from San Diego
Writers from Springfield, Massachusetts
Female United States Navy personnel
Writers from Massachusetts
American women journalists
21st-century American non-fiction writers
21st-century American women writers
Women magazine editors
United States Navy sailors